John Francis Nunn  (7 November 1925 – 9 May 2022) was a British physician who was the dean of the Faculty of Anaesthetists, Royal College of Surgeons from 1979–82.

Nunn was born in  Colwyn Bay, Denbighshire, Wales, the son of Francis Nunn. He married Sheila Ernestine Doubleday in 1949.

Selected publications
 Applied Respiratory Physiology: With Special Reference to Anaesthesia. Butterworths, London, c. 1969.
 Ancient Egyptian Medicine. British Museum Press, London, c. 1996. 
 The Tale of Peter Rabbit: Hieroglyph Edition. British Museum Press, London, 2005.

References

1925 births
Year of death missing
People from Colwyn Bay
Deans of the Royal College of Anaesthetists
British anaesthetists
Fellows of the Royal College of Anaesthetists
Fellows of the Royal College of Surgeons